Our Street is a 1931 historical novel by the British writer Compton Mackenzie.

References

Bibliography
 David Joseph Dooley. Compton Mackenzie. Twayne Publishers, 1974.

1931 British novels
Novels by Compton Mackenzie
Novels set in London
British historical novels
Novels set in the 19th century
Cassell (publisher) books